Centenario (Italian and Spanish) or Centenário (Portuguese) is an adjective meaning Centenary, and relating to a period of 100 years.

Centenario may refer to:

Currency
 Centenario (coin), a Mexican gold coin

Places
 Centenario, Neuquén, a village and municipality in Neuquén Province, Argentina
 Centenário, Rio Grande do Sul, a municipality in Rio Grande do Sul, Brazil
 Centenario, Tijuana, a borough in Baja California, Mexico
Centenário, Tocantins, a municipality in Tocantins, Brazil
 Centenario, Uruguay, a town in Durazno, Uruguay
 Centenário do Sul, a municipality in Paraná, Brazil
 Centenario Bridge, Seville, Spain

Sports
 Estadio Centenario, a football stadium in Montevideo, Uruguay
 Estadio Centenario (Armenia, Colombia), a football stadium in Armenia, Colombia
 Estadio Centenario (Resistencia), a football stadium in Resistencia, Argentina
 Estádio Centenário, a football stadium in Caxias do Sul, Brazil

Other uses
 Radio Centenario, a Uruguayan radio station
 Lamborghini Centenario, an Italian sports car

See also
Century (disambiguation)
Centenary (disambiguation)
Centennial (disambiguation)